Diplocalyptis shanpingana, also amended to Diplocalyptis shanpinganus, is a moth of the family Tortricidae. It is found in Taiwan.

The wingspan is 13–14 mm. Adults are on wing from late March to mid-May.

References

Archipini
Moths of Taiwan
Endemic fauna of Taiwan
Moths described in 2000
Taxa named by Józef Razowski